Samko is the district (amphoe) in the western part of Ang Thong province, central Thailand.

History
The district was separated from Wiset Chai Chan district to become a minor district (king amphoe) in 1962. It was upgraded to full district in 1965.

Geography
Neighboring districts are (from the north clockwise) Pho Thong and Wiset Chai Chan of Ang Thong Province and Si Prachan of Suphanburi province.

Administration
The district is divided into five sub-districts (tambon) and 37 administrative villages (muban). The sub-district municipality (thesaban tambon) Samko covers the tambon Samko, Ratsadon Phatthana, and Mongkhon Tham Nimit. Op Thom and Pho Muang Phan have a tambon administrative organization as their local government.

References

Sam Ko